The Special Representative of the Secretary-General for East Timor was appointed by the Secretary-General to lead the United Nations Transitional Administration in East Timor. During the transition from Indonesian rule to independence the United Nations appointed administrator fulfilled a role, which could be said to correspond in some ways to that of a head of state.

List

See also
Special Representative of the Secretary-General

References 

History of East Timor
United Nations operations in East Timor